Alexander Cockburn Hastings BEM (17 March 1912 – 26 December 1988) was a Scottish footballer who played for Sunderland and the Scotland national football team, primarily as a left half.

Club career
Born in Falkirk, Hastings played for local club Stenhousemuir before moving to Sunderland in 1930. Hastings made his debut for Sunderland in a 1–1 tie against Portsmouth at Fratton Park.  He served as a captain throughout much of the 1930s, and led Sunderland to a 1936 League Championship. Hastings made 304 appearances and scored eight goals, becoming known as one of Sunderland's "great names."

After retiring as a player, Hastings managed Kilmarnock and scouted for Stoke City. He later emigrated to Australia, where he became president of the South Australian Soccer Federation and was awarded the British Empire Medal for services to association football in the 1981 Birthday Honours.

International career
He won his first international cap for Scotland on 13 November 1935 against Northern Ireland in a 2–1 at Tynecastle Stadium. He won one further cap, in total winning just two caps over 1935 to 1937.

References

Sources

1912 births
1988 deaths
Scottish footballers
Scotland international footballers
Sunderland A.F.C. players
Association football wing halves
Footballers from Falkirk
English Football League players
Scottish Football League players
Stenhousemuir F.C. players
Hartlepool United F.C. wartime guest players
Scottish football managers
Kilmarnock F.C. managers
Stoke City F.C. non-playing staff
Scottish emigrants to Australia
Recipients of the British Empire Medal
Association football scouts
Scottish Football League managers